The 1904 Canadian Amateur Hockey League (CAHL) season was the sixth season of the league. Teams played an eight-game schedule. This was a tumultuous year as Ottawa resigned in February and defaulted four games. The Quebec Hockey Club placed first to take the championship. Quebec did not play for the Stanley Cup.

Also, prior to the start of the season a rival hockey league, the Federal Amateur Hockey League was started, with the Montreal Wanderers taking most of the 'Little Men of Iron' from the Montreal Hockey Club.

League business

Executive 
 Harry Trihey, Shamrocks (President)
 F. Stocking, Quebec (1st Vice-President)
 J. P. Dickson ( 2nd Vice-President)
 Fred McRobie, Montreal (Secretary-Treasurer)

As the Wanderers had signed players from Montreal, it was forbidden for teams to play games against FAHL teams, and for team officials to participate in FAHL activities.

Season

Highlights 

This season saw several impressive rookies including Frank Patrick for Montreal Victorias, Ernie (Moose) Johnson for Montreal and Alf Smith and Jim McGee for Ottawa.

The season started out with Ottawa winning their first four games. However, in their third game against the Victorias, the Ottawa team arrived 1½ hours late. The game was called at midnight, with Ottawa ahead 4–1. After a game where the Shamrocks arrived late in Ottawa, the League levied fines against the Shamrocks and Ottawa, and ordered the Ottawa-Victorias game to be replayed. Despite a threat from Mr. Dickson of Ottawa that Ottawa would resign if the game was to be replayed, the League continued to demand that the game be played. The Ottawa club offered to play it if it had a bearing on the league championship, but this was not acceptable to the league. In the end, Ottawa resigned from the league and the league considered the final four games to be forfeits. This overshadowed a great season from Quebec, which won the CAHL season with a record of 5–1 (plus two wins by forfeit).

Final standings 

‡ Resigned from league.

Stanley Cup challenges 

Ottawa would leave the CAHL in mid-season, leaving Quebec to win the league. The Stanley Cup did not pass to the Quebec Bulldogs based on their league championship. The Cup trustees decided that the Cup went with Ottawa. Quebec refused to make a challenge for the Stanley Cup, arguing that the Cup belonged to the CAHL season winner.

Winnipeg vs. Ottawa 
Before they resigned from the CAHL, Ottawa HC defended the Cup against the Winnipeg Rowing Club in a best two-of-three series played in Ottawa 9–1,2–6,2–0 (2–1).

Source: Montreal Gazette

Source: Montreal Gazette

Source: Montreal Gazette

Exhibitions 
After the season, the Montreal Victorias travelled to New York city, to play against Brooklyn Crescents and the New York Wanderers. The Victorias tied Brooklyn 8–8 and lost to the Wanderers 6–4.

Schedule and results 

† Ordered to be replayed but never replayed as Ottawa
resigned from league.

†† Quebec clinches league championship.

Player statistics

Goaltending averages 
Note: GP = Games played, GA = Goals against, SO = Shutouts, GAA = Goals against average

Scoring leaders 
Note: GP = Game played, G = Goals scored

Stanley Cup engraving 
The following Ottawa Hockey Club players and staff were members of the Stanley Cup winning team.
1904 Ottawa Hockey Club Silver Sevens

Montreal Wanderers vs. Ottawa 
A two-game series between the Montreal Wanderers from the FAHL and Ottawa from the CAHL was arranged, for the Stanley Cup. The teams played the first game in Montreal to a tie of 5–5. Montreal refused to play overtime, demanding that the game be considered a no-contest and proposed that the series start over as a best two-of-three series. The Cup trustees demanded that the series continued as scheduled and the Wanderers abandoned the challenge.

According to the Gazette, the game saw "the dirtiest game ever seen between two senior teams at the Arena." Thirty-six penalties were called. Thomas Leahy was injured and replaced by Ken Mallen. James Strachan, president of the Wanderers was quoted as saying that the Wanderers would not go to Ottawa and play with Dr. Kearns as referee. Ottawa took a 2–0 lead, before the Wanderers scored five in a row. The Ottawas came back with three, the final goal by Frank McGee.

Source: Montreal Gazette

The Wanderers demanded a replay of the game to be held in Montreal, which Ottawa refused. The series was cancelled, with Ottawa retained the Stanley Cup championship. Ottawa then joined FAHL in the offseason.
|
|}

Brandon Wheat City vs. Ottawa 
Brandon Wheat City Hockey Club, the Manitoba League champion challenged for the Cup in a best two-of-three series. It was scheduled only days after the Montreal Wanderers challenge (Coleman page. 98–99)

 Spare - Brandon - Robert Cross (Captain), William Hopper, S.G Lowe, H. Breton, F. Wheelan
 Spares - Ottawa - Billy Gilmour - RW, Arthur Moore - D. (Coleman page 98–99).
 Refeeree F. Chittick - Umpirers Senator Watson, William Foran

 Spare - Brandon - Robert Cross (Captain), William Hopper, S.G Lowe, H. Breton, F. Wheelan
 Spares - Ottawa - Billy Gilmour - RW, Arthur Moore - D
 Refeeree F. Chittick - Umpirers Senator Watson, William Foran

See also 
 1904 FAHL season
 1904-05 FAHL season - Stanley Cup Champions Ottawa Silver Sevens
 List of Stanley Cup champions

References

Bibliography

Notes

1904
CAHL